Arthur Piantadosi (November 4, 1916 – February 23, 1994) was an American sound engineer. He won an Academy Award for Best Sound for the Robert Redford film All the President's Men and was nominated for six more in the same category. He won a BAFTA Award in 1973 for Best Sound for the 1972 film Cabaret.

He worked as a music mixer for Warner Brothers, 20th Century-Fox, Columbia Pictures, Republic Pictures, and Universal Studios. During World War II, he worked for the Office of Strategic Services in John Ford's department.  He was the nephew of composer Al Piantadosi.

Selected filmography
Piantadosi won an Academy Award and was nominated for another six:

Won
 All the President's Men (1976)

Nominated
 Marooned (1969)
 Butterflies Are Free (1972)
 Bite the Bullet (1975)
 The Electric Horseman (1979)
 Altered States (1980)
 Tootsie (1982)

References

External links

All the President's Men Wins Sound: 49th Oscars

1916 births
1994 deaths
American audio engineers
Best Sound BAFTA Award winners
Best Sound Mixing Academy Award winners
Engineers from New York City
People from Brooklyn
20th-century American engineers